Lozano is a surname of Spanish and also Italian-Swiss origins. Notable people with the surname include:

Surname
 Agricol Lozano (1927–1999), Mexican poet, historian, and leader
 Alejandro Lozano (1939–2003), Spanish artist, painter and mosaic muralist
 Álvaro Lozano (born 1964), Colombian road racing cyclist
 Anthony Lozano (born 1993), Honduran football player
 Armando Lozano (born 1984), Spanish football player
 Bani Lozano (born 1987), Honduran football player
 Carolina Telechea i Lozano (born 1981), Catalan politician
 César Lozano (born 1977), Mexican football player
 Chris Lozano (born 1982), American mixed martial arts fighter
 Conrad Lozano (born 1951), American musician for Los Lobos
 Demetrio Lozano (born 1975), Spanish handball player
 Florencia Lozano (born 1969), American actress
 Francisco Lozano (1932–2008), Mexican Olympic cyclist, also known as "el camaron Lozano"
 Guillermina Lozano, American geneticist
 Gustavo Lozano-Contreras (1938–2000), Colombian botanist
 Hirving Lozano (born 1995), Mexican football player
 Ignacio E. Lozano, Jr. (born 1927), former United States Ambassador to El Salvador
 Ignacio E. Lozano, Sr. (1886–1953), Mexican-born American journalist
 Irene Lozano (born 1971), Spanish journalist, writer, and politician
 Jaime Lozano (born 1979), Mexican football player
 Javier Lozano (disambiguation)
 John Harold Lozano (born 1972), Colombian retired football player
 John Jairo Lozano (born 1984), Colombian football player
 Jorge Lozano (born 1963), Mexican retired professional tennis player
 Jorge Tadeo Lozano (1771–1816), Neogranadine (now Colombian) scientist, journalist, and politician
 José I. Lozano (born 1954), American vice-chairman and executive vice-president of Impremedia LLC
 José María Lozano (1878–1933), Secretary of Public Education and Fine Arts for Victoriano Huerta, during the Mexican Revolution
 Juan Lozano (born 1955), Spanishfootball player
 Karyme Lozano (born 1978), Mexican-born telenovela actress and singer
 Ladislas Lozano (born 1952), Spanish football coach and player
 Lee Lozano (1930-1999), American painter and visual and conceptual artist
 Liliana Lozano (1978–2009), Colombian actress and beauty queen
 Lourdes Lozano (born 1962), Mexican fencer
 Luis Lozano (born 1992), Mexican sprint canoer
 Mario Lozano, member of the U.S. Army indicted by an Italian court for his role in the death of Italian Secret Service officer Nicola Calipari
 Manuel Lozano (disambiguation)
 Margarita Lozano (1931–2022), Spanish actress
 Miguel Ángel Lozano (born 1990), Mexican-American comedian
 Miguel Ángel Lozano (born 1978), Spanish football player
 Mimi Lozano (born 1933), American educator and activist for Hispanic rights
 Monica C. Lozano (born 1956), American newspaper editor
 Oliver Lozano (1940–2018), legal counsel of the late Ferdinand Marcos
 Oriol Lozano (born 1981), Spanish football player
 Pedro Lozano (1697–1752), Spanish ethnographer, historian and Jesuit missionary
 Rafael Lozano (born 1970), Spanish former boxer 
 Raúl Lozano (volleyball) (born 1956), Argentine volleyball coach
 Rudy Lozano (1951–1983), Chicago politician and activist
 Rodolfo Lozano (1942–2018), American jurist
 Tilsa Lozano (born 1982), Peruvian model
 Verónica Lozano (born 1970), Argentine actress and TV host
 Virgil Lozano (born 1979), Mexican mixed martial artist

People with compound surnames
 Javier Lozano Alarcón (born 1962), Mexican politician
 Javier Lozano Chavira (born 1971), Mexican football player
 Javier Lozano Cid (born 1960), Spanish futsal player
 Gustavo Lozano-Contreras (1938-2000), Colombian botanist
 Angélica Lozano Correa (born 1975), Colombian lawyer and politician
 Julio Lozano Díaz (1885–1957), President of Honduras from 1954 to 1956
 Carmen Lozano Dumler (1921–2015), one of the first Puerto Rican women to become a United States Army officer
 Rafael Lozano-Hemmer (born 1967), Mexican-Canadian electronic artist
 Sergio Lozano Martínez (born 1988), Spanish futsal player
 Juan Manuel Lozano Mejía (1929–2007), Mexican physicist
 Allisson Marian Lozano Núñez (born 1992), Mexican actress model and singer
 Juan Lozano Ramírez (born 1964), Colombian lawyer and journalist 
 Rafael Aceves y Lozano (1837–1876), Spanish composer
 Guzmán Casaseca Lozano (born 1984), Spanish professional football player
 Don Fernando de Buen y Lozano (1895-1962), Spanish ichthyologist and oceanographer
 Francisco de Paula del Villar y Lozano (1828–1901), Spanish architect
 Raúl García Lozano (born 1980), Spanish football player
 José Jiménez Lozano (1930–2020), Spanish writer
 José Mariano Mociño Suárez Lozano (1757–1820), naturalist from New Spain
 Jesús Olmo Lozano (born 1985), Spanish football player
 José Guadalupe Padilla Lozano (1920–2013), Mexican prelate of the Roman Catholic Church
 Julio Palacios Lozano (born 1962), Salvadoran football player
 Julio Palau Lozano (born 1925), Valencian pilota Escala i corda variant player
 Rafael Ramos Lozano (born 1982), Spanish football player
 Octavio Paz Lozano (1914–1998), Mexican writer, poet, and diplomat
 Rodrigo Ríos Lozano (born 1990), Spanish football player 
 Ángel Rodríguez Lozano (born 1952), Spanish radio journalist
 Francisco Ruiz Lozano (1607-1677), Peruvian soldier, astronomer, mathematician, and educator
 Raúl Salinas Lozano (1917–2004), Mexican economist

References

Spanish-language surnames